Kumen is a dispersed settlement in the Pohorje Hills in the Municipality of Lovrenc na Pohorju in northeastern Slovenia. The area is part of the traditional region of Styria. It is now included in the Drava Statistical Region.

A chapel with a belfry in the northeastern part of the settlement is dedicated to Saint Anne and was built in 1659.

References

External links
Kumen on Geopedia

Populated places in the Municipality of Lovrenc na Pohorju